Danaa Batgerel (born July 4, 1989) is a Mongolian mixed martial artist who competes in the Bantamweight division of the Ultimate Fighting Championship.

Background
Growing up in a rural region of Mongolia, Batgerel began training kickboxing in 2007, before picking up mixed martial arts in 2010.

Mixed martial arts career

Early career
Batgerel has been competing professionally since 2011, compiling a 7–1 record before the UFC. Before joining the UFC, he competed in Legend Fighting Championship, Ranik Ultimate Fighting Federation, Baikal Fighting Championship and Mongol Fighting Championship, among others. His most notable bout during this time was a win over fellow future UFC fighter, Kai Kara-France.

Ultimate Fighting Championship
Batgerel made his debut on August 31, 2019 at UFC Fight Night: Andrade vs. Zhang against Alateng Heili. He lost the fight via unanimous decision. This fight earned him the Fight of the Night award.

Batgerel faced Guido Cannetti on March 7, 2020 at UFC 248. He won the fight via knockout in the first round.

Batgerel was expected to face Kyler Phillips at UFC on ESPN: Holm vs. Aldana on October 4, 2020. However, Batgerel pulled out due to travel restrictions related to the COVID-19 pandemic in Mongolia. He was replaced by promotional newcomer Cameron Else.

Batgerel faced Kevin Natividad at UFC 261 on April 24, 2021. He won the fight via technical knockout in round one.

Batgerel was scheduled to face Montel Jackson on September 18, 2021, at UFC Fight Night 192. However, Batgerel was pulled from the event due to visa issues and he was replaced by JP Buys.

Batgerel faced Brandon Davis on October 16, 2021, at UFC Fight Night 195.  He won the fight via technical knockout in round one. This win earned him the Performance of the Night award.

Batgerel was scheduled to face Montel Jackson on March 26, 2022 at UFC on ESPN 33. However, Jackson had to pull out of the bout and was replaced by Chris Gutiérrez. Batgerel lost the fight via spinning backfist TKO in the second round.

Batgerel, replacing Saimon Oliveira, faced Kang Kyung-Ho on June 11, 2022, at UFC 275. He lost the bout via unanimous decision.

Batgerel was expected to face Brady Hiestand on April 15, 2023 at  UFC on ESPN 44 However, the pair was moved to UFC Fight Night 222 on April 22, 2023 for undisclosed reasons.

Championships and accomplishments

Mixed martial arts 
 Ultimate Fighting Championship
 Fight of the Night (One time)  
Performance of the Night (One time) 
MGL-1 Fighting Championship
 MGL Featherweight Championship

Mixed martial arts record

|-
|Loss
| align=center|12–4
|Kang Kyung-ho
|Decision (unanimous)
|UFC 275
|
|align=center|3
|align=center|5:00
|Kallang, Singapore
|
|-
|Loss
| align=center|12–3
|Chris Gutiérrez
|TKO (spinning backfist and elbows)
|UFC on ESPN: Blaydes vs. Daukaus
|
|align=center|2
|align=center|2:34
|Columbus, Ohio, United States
|
|-
|Win
|align=center|12–2
|Brandon Davis
|TKO (elbows and punches)
|UFC Fight Night: Ladd vs. Dumont
|
|align=center|1
|align=center|2:01
|Las Vegas, Nevada, United States
|
|-
| Win
| align=center|11–2
| Kevin Natividad
| TKO (punches)
| UFC 261
| 
| align=center|1
| align=center|0:50
| Jacksonville, Florida, United States
|
|-
| Win
| align=center|10–2
| Guido Cannetti
|KO (punches)
|UFC 248
|
|align=center|1
|align=center|3:01
|Las Vegas, Nevada, United States
|
|-
| Loss
| align=center|9–2
|Alateng Heili
|Decision (unanimous)
|UFC Fight Night: Andrade vs. Zhang
|
|align=center|3
|align=center|5:00
|Shenzhen, China
|
|-
| Win
| align=center|9–1
| Haitao Ti
| Submission (rear-naked choke)
| Mongol FC 2
| 
| align=center|1
| align=center|3:05
|Ulaanbaatar, Mongolia
|
|-
| Win
| align=center| 8–1
| Sukhbold Sodnomdorj
| KO (knee to the body)
| MGL-1 FC 11
| 
| align=center|1
| align=center|1:40
| Erdenet, Mongolia
| 
|-
| Win
| align=center| 7–1
| Aldar Budanaev
| TKO (elbows and punches)
| Baikal FC 5
|
|align=Center|2
|align=center|1:18
|Ulan-Ude, Russia
| 
|-
| Win
| align=center| 6–1
| Jiahao Hao
| TKO (punches)
| Chin Woo Men: 2017-2018 Season: Stage 3
| 
| align=center|1
| align=center|4:14
| Hefei, China
| 
|-
| Win
| align=center| 5–1
| Tianlong Luo
| TKO (punches)
| Chin Woo Men: 2017-2018 Season, Stage 2
|
|align=Center|2
|align=center|4:47
|Wuhan, China
| 
|-
| Loss
| align=center| 4–1
| Baasankhuu Damnlanpurev
| Decision (unanimous)
| MGL-1 FC 7
| 
|align=center|3
|align=center|5:00
| Ulaanbaatar, Mongolia
|
|-
| Win
| align=center| 4–0
| Rijirigala Amu
| Submission (rear-naked choke)
| Ranik Ultimate Fighting Federation 12
| 
| align=center| 2
| align=center| N/A
| Shanghai, China
| 
|-
| Win
| align=center| 3–0
| Kai Kara-France
|Decision (unanimous)
|Legend FC 11
|
|align=center|3
|align=center|5:00
|Kuala Lumpur, Malaysia
| 
|-
| Win
| align=center| 2–0
| Jazor Ablasi
| Decision (majority)
| Legend FC 8
| 
| align=center| 3
| align=center| 5:00
| Hong Kong, SAR, China
|
|-
| Win
| align=center| 1–0
| Vincent Siu
| TKO (punches)
| Legend FC 6
| 
| align=center| 1
| align=center| 3:39
| Cotai, Macau
|

See also 
 List of current UFC fighters
 List of male mixed martial artists

References

External links 
  
 

1989 births
Living people
Mongolian male mixed martial artists
Bantamweight mixed martial artists
Mixed martial artists utilizing kickboxing
Ultimate Fighting Championship male fighters
People from Sükhbaatar Province